Rodolfo Pérez may refer to:
 Rodolfo Pérez (field hockey)
 Rodolfo Pérez (judoka)

See also
 Rodolfo Pérez Pimentel, Ecuadorian lawyer, historian, and biographer